Maniple may refer to:

 Maniple (military unit), a division of a Roman legion
 Maniple (vestment), a liturgical vestment worn on the left arm.